Conflict is an album by alto saxophonist Jimmy Woods' Sextet featuring Elvin Jones, which was recorded in 1963 and released on the Contemporary label.

Reception

AllMusic awarded the album 4 stars with a review by Scott Yanow stating: "While all of the soloists are impressive and Jones' powerful drumming fuels the horn players, the leader's adventurous alto sax is not to be missed".

Track listing 
All compositions by Jimmy Woods
 "Conflict" - 5:45
 "Coming Home" - 6:00
 "Aim" - 7:55
 "Apart Together" - 6:43
 "Look to Your Heart" - 5:49
 "Pazmuerte" - 6:30
 "Conflict" [alternate take 5] - 4:50 Bonus track on CD reissue
 "Aim" [alternate take 43] - 7:10 Bonus track on CD reissue
 "Look to Your Heart" [alternate take 39] - 5:50 Bonus track on CD reissue

Personnel 
Jimmy Woods - alto saxophone
Carmell Jones - trumpet 
Harold Land - tenor saxophone
Andrew Hill - piano
George Tucker - bass
Elvin Jones - drums

References 

Jimmy Woods albums
1963 albums
Contemporary Records albums